The 1979 edition of the Copa América association football tournament was played between 18 July and 12 December. It was not held in a particular country, all matches were played on a home and away basis. Defending champions Peru were given a bye into the semi-finals.

Squads

Group stage
The teams were drawn into three groups, consisting of three teams each. Each team played twice (home and away) against the other teams in their group, with two points for a win, one point for a draw, nil points for a loss. The winner of each group advanced to the semi-finals.

Peru qualified automatically as holders for the semifinal.

Group A

Group B

Group C

Knockout stage

Semi-finals

Chile won 3–1 on points.

Paraguay won 3–1 on points.

Finals

As the teams were tied 2–2 on points, a play-off on a neutral ground was required to determine the winner.

The play-off match finished tied after extra time expired, meaning the teams finished 3–3 on points. Paraguay won on aggregate 3–1.

Goal scorers
With four goals, Jorge Peredo and Eugenio Morel are the top scorer in the tournament. In total, 63 goals were scored by 41 different players, with none of them credited as own goal.

4 goals
  Jorge Peredo
  Eugenio Morel

3 goals

  Sócrates
  Carlos Caszely
  Carlos Rivas
  Julio César Romero

2 goals

  Daniel Passarella
  Carlos Aragonés
  Jesús Reynaldo
  Tita
  Zico
  Milcíades Morel
  Hugo Talavera
  Waldemar Victorino

1 goal

  Hugo Coscia
  Roberto Osvaldo Díaz
  Jorge Gáspari
  Carlos Angel López
  Diego Maradona
  Paulo Roberto Falcão
  Palhinha
  Roberto Dinamite
  Mario Soto
  Leonardo Véliz
  Patricio Yáñez
  Gabriel Chaparro
  Ernesto Díaz
  Arnoldo Iguarán
  Jaime Morón
  Félix Valverde
  Jorge Luis Alarcón
  Fausto Klinger
  Mario Tenorio
  Carlos Torres Garcés
  Juvencio Osorio
  Alicio Solalinde
  Roberto Mosquera
  Alberto Bica
  Denis Milar
  Rubén Paz
  Rodolfo Carbajal

References

External links
 Copa América 1979 at RSSSF
 Attendance information

 
Copa América tournaments
1979 in South American football